Manteca colorá (Andalusian pronunciation for "red lard") is a food item prepared by adding spices (usually bay leaf and oregano) and paprika – which is what gives the dish its characteristic orange colour – to lard, which is then cooked with minced or finely chopped pieces of pork.

It is a dish typical of Andalusia in southern Spain, where it is usually consumed spread on toasted bread.

See also
 List of spreads

References

Andalusian cuisine
Spreads (food)